"I'm Still Waiting" is a song by American R&B group Jodeci from their debut album Forever My Lady (1991). The song was the fifth and last single released in promotion for the album in August 1992. The "Swing Hip Hop Mix" (or "Swing Mob Radio Mix") version is the version of the song used in the music video instead of the album version.

Track listings

12", 33 1/3 RPM, CD, Vinyl
"I'm Still Waiting" (Album Version) - 4:21
"I'm Still Waiting" (Jazz Version) - 4:58
"I'm Still Waiting" (Instrumental) - 4:50

Cassette, CD, 12" LP Vinyl
"I'm Still Waiting" (Swing Mob Radio Mix) - 4:15
"I'm Still Waiting" (Swing Hip Hop Mix) - 4:28
"I'm Still Waiting" (Daddy's Jeep Mix) - 5:58
"I'm Still Waiting" (Daddy Hip Hop) - 6:00
"I'm Still Waiting" (Mr. Dalvin Raps) - 5:15

Charts

Personnel
K-Ci Hailey - Lead and Background vocals
Jojo Hailey - Background vocals
DeVante Swing - Background vocals, Instruments
Mr. Dalvin - Background vocals

Notes

1992 singles
Jodeci songs
Song recordings produced by DeVante Swing
Songs written by DeVante Swing
1991 songs
Uptown Records singles
MCA Records singles